The Bulwark is an American conservative news and opinion website launched in 2018 by Sarah Longwell, with the support of Bill Kristol and Charlie Sykes. It initially launched as a news aggregator, but it was revamped into a news and opinion site using key staffers from the recently closed Weekly Standard.

History 
Following the end of publication of The Weekly Standard in December 2018, editor-in-chief Charlie Sykes said: "the murder of the Standard made it urgently necessary to create a home for rational, principled, fact-based center-right voices who were not cowed by Trumpism." The site was created in December 2018 as a news aggregator as a project of the Defending Democracy Together Institute, a 501(c)(3) conservative advocacy group led in part by Weekly Standard co-founder William Kristol. Several former editors and writers of The Weekly Standard soon joined the staff and within weeks of launch began publishing original news and opinion pieces. The website has frequently published pieces critical of Trump and pro-Trump elites in politics and the media.

A podcast hosted by Sykes was launched on December 21, 2018. Longwell said that each of the podcast's January 2021 episodes were downloaded about 100,000 times. The publication's other podcasts include Shield of the Republic cohosted by Eric Edelman and Eliot Cohen, Beg to Differ hosted by Mona Charen, The Focus Group with Sarah Longwell, and The Bulwark Goes to Hollywood with Sonny Bunch, A French Village with Sarah Longwell and Benjamin Wittes, as well as The Secret Podcast, The Next Level, and Across the Movie Aisle, available only for paid subscribers.

As a non-profit project, The Bulwark does not run advertising, and is supported by donations. By January 2019, approximately $1 million had already been raised for the site, which was said to be adequate to keep the site running for one year. In 2021, The Bulwark launched Bulwark+, a program that provides paid subscribers with "exclusive podcasts, newsletters, and live-streams" for about $100 a year; within a few months, the website reported roughly 16,000 subscribers. 

In 2021, Washingtonian magazine noted that content on The Bulwark is primarily geared toward readers seeking "serious coverage of events through a center-right filter" but that its editors have sought to attract centrist Democratic readers who may be "uncomfortable with the excesses of the progressive left."

Staff 
The founder is Charlie Sykes who also serves as editor-at-large along with William Kristol. With Sarah Longwell serving as publisher, the staff also include editors Jonathan V. Last, Adam Keiper, Jim Swift, Martyn Wendell Jones, Benjamin Parker, Sonny Bunch, and Mona Charen. Writers include Theodore R. Johnson, William Saletan, Cathy Young, Tim Miller, and Amanda Carpenter.

References

External links 
 

2018 establishments in the United States
American conservative websites
American news websites
Internet properties established in 2018
Never Trump movement
Centre-right politics
Neoconservatism